The Belarusian Patriotic Party (BPP) is a political party in Belarus loyal to President Alexander Lukashenko. Nikolai Ulakhovich is party chairman.

History
The party was established in 1994, and was initially named the Belarusian Patriotic Movement. The party was originally formed under presidential candidate Alexander Lukashenko. Major General, Honored Pilot of the Soviet Union, Deputy Chairman of the Union of Officers of Belarus Anatoly Barankevich became the leader of the party.

BPM won one seat in the second round of voting in the 1995 parliamentary elections. It changed its name to the Belarusian Patriotic Party in 1996.

On August 19, 2000, at a congress, the BPP nominated 16 candidates for the parliamentary elections

When checking the Telegraph correspondent of the offices of parties registered in Belarus, it turned out that the BPP has not been at its address since at least 2009, which does not correspond to the information posted on the official website of the Ministry of Justice of Belarus.

The party nominated Nikolai Ulakhovich as its candidate for the 2015 presidential elections. Ulakhovich finished fourth in a field of four candidates with 1.7% of the vote.

On February 18, 2018, following the results of the elections to the Minsk City Council of Deputies, one of the candidates from the Belarusian Patriotic Party was able to be elected to the local Council of Deputies.

In the summer of 2020, the BPP called on voters to support the candidacy of Alexander Lukashenko in the upcoming presidential elections.

The Belarusian Patriotic Party is allied with the Communist Party of Belarus and the Liberal Democratic Party of Belarus. It cooperates with the Belarusian Exarchate of the Russian Orthodox Church and former military organizations.

Ideology and goals
Assistance in building a socially just society; assistance to the formation of a renewed union of fraternal peoples and, first of all, Russia, Belarus, Ukraine; supporting the president in his efforts to implement the preeminent program and urgent measures to bring Belarus out of the crisis; protection of national interests, honor and dignity of the Fatherland in all spheres. Among the program points of the BPP was even the abolition of the Belovezha Accords.

BPP Council
 Nikolai Dmitrievich Ulakhovich (born 1951/08/21) - Chairman of the Board of the BPP
 Sergey Alexandrovich Poletaev (born 1975/11/14) - Deputy Chairman of the Board of the BPP
 Leokadiya Dmitrovna Romeyko (born 1959/01/30) - Deputy Chairman of the Board of the BPP
 Grigory Grigorievich Motuzo (born 1962/05/20) - head of the Brest organization
 Viktor Nikolaevich Nikolaev (born 1965/05/06) - head of the Vitebsk organization
 Sergey Grigorievich Lemeshevsky (born 1970/09/20) - head of the Mogilev organization
 Ilya Nikolaevich Ulakhovich (born 1980/12/02) - Head of the Legal Department
 Vitaly Aleksandrovich Romeyko (born 1986/10/22) - head of the Kastrychnitski District organization of Minsk

Election results

Presidential elections

Legislative elections

References 

1994 establishments in Belarus
Socialist parties in Belarus
Political parties established in 1994
Political parties in Belarus